, may refer to:

Naftogaz of Ukraine, Ukrainian oil and gas company, NJSC 
Rusneftegaz, Russian oil company
Soyuzneftegaz, Russian oil company
Surgutneftegas, Russian oil company, OJSC  
Yuganskneftegaz, Russian oil company